Superpak Vol. I and II are the second and third official compilation albums by American singer/actress Cher respectively. These compilations most prominently feature Cher's 1966 single, "Bang Bang (My Baby Shot Me Down)", as well as her 1965 debut single, "All I Really Want to Do". The rest of the albums feature other singles by Cher from the 1960s. Among those singles are: "Needles and Pins", "Alfie", "Hey Joe", and many more. All the songs that are sung are covers of the original versions.

Track listing

Volume 1

Volume 2

Notes
 Buffy Sainte-Marie is incorrectly credited as Buffy St. Marie.
 Vito Pallavicini is uncredited.
 You Better Sit Down Kids is incorrectly titled as You'd Better Sit Down Kids.
 Dickey Lee is incorrectly credited as D. L. Lipscomb.
 Robert Chauvigny is uncredited.
 Hugo Peretti is incorrectly credited as Perette.

Personnel
Cher - lead vocals
Sonny Bono - producer

Charts 
Volume One

Volume Two

References

External links
Official Cher site

1972 greatest hits albums
Cher compilation albums